Halbro Sportswear Limited is a British manufacturer of sportswear and equipment for both codes of Rugby. The firm was established in 1919 and is based in the town of Horwich, Greater Manchester.

Clubs using Halbro jerseys include the RAF Rugby League Team and many northern rugby union clubs, and also at football in the Scottish League Two supplying Annan Athletic.

External links

Sportswear brands
Sporting goods manufacturers of the United Kingdom